Ihor Ozarkiv (born 21 January 1992) is a professional Ukrainian football midfielder who plays for FC Kolkheti-1913 Poti.

Career
Ozarkiv is the product of the Karpaty Lviv Youth School System. He made his debut for FC Karpaty entering as a second-half substitute against FC Volyn Lutsk on 1 October 2011 in Ukrainian Premier League.

He played for club FC Nyva Ternopil in Ukrainian First League. He also played for Ukrainian national football teams in different age representations.

References

External links
Statistics at FFU website (Ukr)

1992 births
Living people
Ukrainian footballers
FC Karpaty Lviv players
FC Oleksandriya players
FC Nyva Ternopil players
Ukrainian Premier League players
FC Kolkheti-1913 Poti players
Ukrainian expatriate footballers
Expatriate footballers in Georgia (country)
Ukrainian expatriate sportspeople in Georgia (country)
Association football midfielders